This is a list of sheriffs and high sheriffs of the English county of Warwickshire.

The Sheriff is the oldest secular office under the Crown. Formerly the Sheriff was the principal law enforcement officer in the county but over the centuries most of the responsibilities associated with the post have been transferred elsewhere or are now defunct, so that its functions are now largely ceremonial.  Under the provisions of the Local Government Act 1972, on 1 April 1974 the office previously known as Sheriff was retitled High Sheriff. The High Sheriff changes every March.

For a period prior to the middle of the 16th century the Sheriff of Warwickshire was also the Sheriff of Leicestershire.

Sheriffs

11th and 12th centuries

From 1158 to 1566 the Sheriff of Warwickshire was also Sheriff of Leicestershire

13th century

14th century

15th century

16th century

17th century

18th century

19th century

20th century

High Sheriffs

20th century

21st century

{{columns-list|colwidth=30em|
2000–2001: John S. Hammon
2001–2002: Sarah Holman
2002–2003: William Matthew Stratford Dugdale
2003–2004: Roger V. Wiglesworth
2004–2005: Gwendoline M. Jefferson
2005–2006: Balraj Singh Dhesi MBE (of Royal Leamington Spa) <ref>

References
 The history of the worthies of England, Volume 3
 The history of the worthies of England, Volume 2

Notes

Sources
 Debrett's Illustrated Baronetage, with the Knightage, 1876, Dean and Son (London), 1876
 Debrett's Baronetage, Knightage and Companionage, 1954, C. F. J. Hankinson (ed.), 1954
 Birmingham Post Year Book and Who's Who, various editions, 1973–85
 Whitaker's Almanack, various editions
 History of the Commoners of Great Britain and Ireland. Volumes 1–4 (1835) John Burke 

 
Warwickshire
People from Warwickshire
History of Warwickshire
Local government in Warwickshire
Warwickshire-related lists